The names Southern Pacific Depot, Southern Pacific Railroad Station, Southern Pacific Railroad Depot, and variations, apply to a number of train stations operated by the Southern Pacific Railroad:

Arizona 
Southern Pacific Railroad Depot (Casa Grande, Arizona), listed on the NRHP in Pinal County
Southern Pacific Railroad Depot (Safford, Arizona), listed on the NRHP in Graham County
Southern Pacific Freight Depot (Yuma, Arizona), NRHP-listed
Southern Pacific Railroad Depot (Yuma, Arizona), NRHP-listed
Yuma (Amtrak station), at the site of a former Southern Pacific Railroad Depot

California 
16th Street station (Oakland)
Benicia Southern Pacific Railroad Passenger Depot, NRHP-listed
 Berkeley Station
Southern Pacific Depot (Chico, California), NRHP-listed
Colfax Depot, Colfax, California
Danville Southern Pacific Railroad Depot, NRHP-listed
Davis (Amtrak station), listed on the NRHP as Southern Pacific Railroad Station
Southern Pacific Depot, Fillmore, California
Folsom Depot, NRHP-listed
Southern Pacific Depot (Fresno, California), NRHP-listed
Glendale Southern Pacific Railroad Depot, now the Glendale Amtrak station, NRHP-listed
Goleta Depot
Lodi Transit Station
Central Station, Los Angeles, main passenger terminal in Los Angeles, California
Southern Pacific Depot (Millbrae, California), NRHP-listed
Southern Pacific Railroad Depot (Modesto, California)
Niles Depot, Fremont, California, now the Niles Depot Museum
NoHo Arts District, Los Angeles (North Hollywood Depot)
Palms-Southern Pacific Railroad Depot 
Sacramento Valley Station, Sacramento, listed on the NRHP as Sacramento Depot
Saint Helena Southern Pacific Railroad Depot, NRHP-listed
San Carlos station, listed on the NRHP as Southern Pacific Depot
Saticoy Southern Pacific Railroad Depot, NRHP-listed
Santa Susana Depot, Simi Valley
Southern Pacific Depot (San Jose, California), now known as Diridon Station, NRHP-listed
Southern Pacific Depot, Sanger, California
Southern Pacific Train Depot (Santa Barbara, California), NRHP-listed
Suisun–Fairfield station
Southern Pacific Depot, Sunol, California
Southern Pacific Railroad Depot, Whittier, NRHP-listed

Louisiana 
Southern Pacific Railroad Depot (New Iberia, Louisiana), NRHP-listed

Nevada
Reno station, listed on the NRHP as Reno Southern Pacific Railroad Depot

Oregon 
Canby Depot Museum, Canby, Oregon
Eugene–Springfield station, listed on the NRHP as Southern Pacific Passenger Depot, in Eugene
Lebanon Southern Pacific Railroad Depot, NRHP-listed
Medford Southern Pacific Railroad Passenger Depot, NRHP-listed
Salem station (Oregon), listed on the NRHP as Salem Southern Pacific Railroad Station
Southern Pacific Railroad Passenger Station and Freight House, Springfield, NRHP-listed

Texas 
Southern Pacific Railroad Freight Depot (Brenham, Texas), listed on the NRHP in Washington County, Texas
Southern Pacific Railroad Depot (Nacogdoches, Texas), listed on the NRHP in Nacogdoches County, Texas
Southern Pacific Depot Historic District, San Antonio, Texas, listed on the NRHP in Bexar County, Texas
Southern Pacific Railroad Passenger Station (San Antonio, Texas), now San Antonio station, NRHP-listed

See also
Southern Pacific Railroad Locomotive No. 1673, Tucson, AZ, listed on the NRHP in Arizona
Southern Pacific Railroad Passenger Coach Car-S.P. X7, Yuma, AZ, listed on the NRHP in Arizona
Southern Pacific Steam Locomotive No. 745, Jefferson, LA, listed on the NRHP in Louisiana
Southern Pacific Railroad: Ogden-Lucin Cut-Off Trestle, Ogden, UT, listed on the NRHP in Utah
Southern Pacific Railroad Section Superintendent House, Folsom, CA, NRHP-listed in Sacramento County
, San Francisco, CA, listed on the NRHP in San Francisco, California